The Awesome Festival (in full the Awesome International Arts Festival for Bright Young Things) is an arts event in Perth, Western Australia held annually since 1995. The participation and interaction of younger visitors is encouraged by street theatre, interactive art, dance workshops, film screenings and musical performances. It is organised and run by Awesome Arts Australia, a not-for-profit company based in Perth.

The company running the festival is also involved with separate programs, including a food art program in the remote mining town of Leonora and school community projects that create works to showcase at the festival. Some of these are sponsored by its commercial partner, the multinational mining company BHP Nickel West.

The festival has featured international acts including a contemporary dance group from Canada and Architects of Air, a United Kingdom-based group designing large inflatable sculptures; minor acts have performed shows exclusive to Perth from France, Taiwan, New Zealand and around the country. Kismet, the prominent theatre company from Apulia, in southern Italy, performed a dance and acrobatics version of Beauty & the Beast in 2002, before touring elsewhere in Australia.

The 2003 program included an interactive video by the Melbourne arts group Chunky Move, a migration and colonisation performance by Hong Kong's City Contemporary Dance Company and the Western Australian Academy of Performing Arts, and contemporary dance by the Canadian group Cas Public. Artists and groups from Belgium, the United Kingdom, Portugal, Slovenia, and France also performed or displayed their work. A performance by Slovenian artist Matej Andraž Vogrinčič involved filling a building site with thousands of beach balls, as a tribute to childhood beach games, and Belgian performance artist Caroline Amorous performed her character Rose, an eccentric old lady interacting with people on the street while walking a poster of a dog. Architects of the Air, based on a design by Nottingham and Geneva-based artist Alan Parkinson, exhibited Ixilum following the similar Arcazzar exhibit in 2002. Ixilum was a small inflatable city, inspired by Iranian architecture and formerly displayed at the Guggenheim Museum Bilbao in Spain.

References

Arts festivals in Australia
Festivals established in 1995
Festivals in Perth, Western Australia
1995 establishments in Australia